Supergirl is a 1984 superhero film directed by Jeannot Szwarc from a screenplay by David Odell based on the DC Comics character of the same name. It is the fourth film in the Superman film series, set after the events of Superman III (1983) and serving as a spin-off of the series. The film stars Helen Slater as Supergirl, along with Faye Dunaway, Hart Bochner, Peter Cook, Mia Farrow, Brenda Vaccaro, and Peter O'Toole, with Marc McClure reprising his role as Jimmy Olsen from the Superman films.

The film was released in the United Kingdom on 19 July 1984 and in the United States on 21 November 1984, but failed to impress critics and audiences alike, while also underperforming at the box-office. Dunaway and O'Toole earned Golden Raspberry Award nominations for Worst Actress and Worst Actor, respectively. However, Slater was nominated for a Saturn Award for Best Actress. The film's failure ultimately led producers Alexander and Ilya Salkind to sell the Superman film rights to The Cannon Group, Inc. in 1986.

Its first DVD release was by the independent home video company Anchor Bay Entertainment in 2000, under license from then-rights holder StudioCanal. Warner Bros. Pictures acquired the rights to the film and reissued it on DVD late in 2006 to coincide with the release of Superman Returns. Although it is canon with the Christopher Reeve Superman films, it is not included in any of the Superman DVD or Blu-ray box sets by Warner Bros.

Plot
Kara Zor-El, cousin of Kal-El/Superman and Jor-El's niece, lives in Argo City, an isolated Kryptonian community that survived the planet's destruction by being transported into a pocket of trans-dimensional space, the Survival Zone. A man named Zaltar allows Kara to see a unique and immensely powerful item known as the Omegahedron, which he has borrowed without the knowledge of the city government, and which powers the city. However, a mishap leads to the Omegahedron being rocketed into space. Taking a ship, Kara follows it to Earth (undergoing a transformation into "Supergirl" in the process) to recover it and save the city.

On Earth, the Omegahedron is recovered by Selena, a power-hungry would-be witch assisted by the feckless Bianca, seeking to free herself from a relationship with warlock Nigel. Whilst not knowing exactly what it is, Selena quickly realizes the Omegahedron is powerful and can give her true magic. Supergirl arrives on Earth and is granted new powers by its environment and the radiation of its sun. While seeking the Omegahedron, she creates the cover identity Linda Lee, cousin of Clark Kent, and enrolls at an all-girls school where she befriends Lucy Lane, the younger sister of Lois Lane who happens to be studying there. Supergirl also meets and becomes enamored with Ethan, a school groundskeeper.

Ethan also catches the eye of Selena, who drugs him with a love potion which will make him fall in love with the first person he sees for a day. Ethan regains consciousness in Selena's absence and wanders out into the streets. An angry Selena uses her new-found powers to animate a construction vehicle to retrieve Ethan, causing chaos as it does so. Supergirl, in the guise of Linda, rescues Ethan, and he falls in love with her instead.

Supergirl and Selena proceed to battle. Selena captures Ethan, then traps Supergirl and sends her to the Phantom Zone, a prison dimension. Now powerless, Supergirl wanders the bleak landscape and nearly drowns in an oily bog. Eventually, she encounters Zaltar, who has exiled himself to the Phantom Zone as a punishment for losing the Omegahedron. Zaltar helps Kara to escape, sacrificing his life to do so. Back on Earth, Selena uses the Omegahedron to make herself a "princess of Earth" with Ethan as her lover and consort.

Emerging from the Phantom Zone through a mirror, Supergirl regains her powers and confronts Selena, who uses the Omegahedron to summon a gigantic shadow demon. The demon is on the verge of defeating Supergirl when she hears Zaltar's voice urging her to fight on. Supergirl breaks free and Nigel tells her the only way to defeat Selena is to turn the demon against her. Supergirl complies and creates a focused whirlwind that traps Selena, who is then attacked and incapacitated by the demon as the whirlwind pulls in Bianca as well. The three are sucked through the mirror portal, which promptly reforms, trapping them all forever. Free from Selena's spell, Ethan admits his love for Linda, knowing she and Supergirl are one and the same. He also understands she must save Argo City and that he may not see her again. The final scene shows Kara returning the Omegahedron to a darkened Argo City, which then lights up again.

Cast
 Helen Slater as Kara Zor-El / Linda Lee / Supergirl
 Faye Dunaway as Selena
 Peter O'Toole as Zaltar 
 Hart Bochner as Ethan
 Mia Farrow as Alura In-Ze
 Brenda Vaccaro as Bianca
 Peter Cook as Nigel
 Simon Ward as Zor-El
 Marc McClure as Jimmy Olsen
 Maureen Teefy as Lucy Lane
 David Healy as Mr. Danvers
 Sandra Dickinson as Pretty Young Lady
 Matt Frewer as Eddie, The Truck Driver
 Kelly Hunter as Argonian Citizen
 Glory Annen as Midvale Protester
 Bradley Lavelle as Lucy's Friend

Cast notes
Christopher Reeve was slated to have a cameo as Superman but bowed out early on. His non-appearance in the film is explained via a news broadcast (overheard by Selena) stating that Superman has left Earth on a "peace-seeking mission" to a distant galaxy. In the Superman documentary You Will Believe..., Director Jeannot Szwarc said Reeve's involvement in this film would have given the feature higher credibility, and admitted he wished Reeve had made a contribution to the film's production. A publicity photo of him as Superman does appear as a poster in Lucy and Linda's shared dorm room.

Marc McClure makes his fourth of five appearances in the Superman-related films; he is the only actor to appear in all four films featuring Superman and this spin-off film. Demi Moore auditioned for and was cast as character Lucy Lane but bowed out to make the film Blame It on Rio. Maureen Teefy was signed instead.

Production
Upon gaining the film rights for Superman: The Movie in 1978, Alexander Salkind and his son, Ilya, also purchased the rights to the character of Supergirl, should any sequel or spin-off occur. Supergirl was originally slated to debut in Superman III in a plot line intended to set up a standalone film, but her character was ultimately removed. The Salkinds announced the Supergirl film in April 1982, before production began on Superman III. After the critical  disappointment of that film, the Salkinds opted to use the Supergirl movie to freshen the franchise. Ilya later recounted, "[It was] something different, to an extent. I thought it was a very different area to explore." Originally the plot was to center around Supergirl rescuing Superman, who would be portrayed as her cousin and mentor, but the film was heavily rewritten after Reeve chose not to be involved.

The producers attempted, and failed, to get the services of Richard Lester, who had directed Superman III and had completed the second film after their dismissal of original director Richard Donner. Robert Wise also turned down the director's chair. But French filmmaker Jeannot Szwarc, who was best known at that time for his work in television and for directing Jaws 2, was ultimately chosen after a meeting with Christopher Reeve, who had complimented the Somewhere in Time director. Szwarc sought advice from Donner over some technical aspects of the production.

Hundreds of actresses tested for the role of Supergirl/Linda, among them Demi Moore and Brooke Shields. Shields and Moore were both ultimately rejected by both Ilya and Szwarc, who had both wanted an unknown actress, and they instead signed Helen Slater, who was paid $75,000 in a three-picture deal. Slater had four months of physical training to prepare for the role. Additionally, Dolly Parton reportedly turned down the role of Selena before it was offered to Dunaway.

Principal photography began at Pinewoods Studios in London on April 18, 1983, and wrapped on August 11, 1983. Although the Salkinds financed the film completely on their own budget, Warner Bros. was still involved in the production since the studio owned the distribution rights to the film, and its parent company, Warner Communications, was also the parent company of DC Comics, owners of all "Superman and Superman family" copyrights. The entire film was shot, edited and overseen under the supervision of Warner Bros. and originally scheduled to be released in July 1984. However, the relationship between the studio and the partnership was strained after the critical and commercial underperformance of Superman III in June 1983, during the production of the film. The Salkinds insisted on moving the opening date from the summer to the holiday season in order to avoid competition with other major films and the 1984 Summer Olympics in Los Angeles. The studio claimed it could not provide a holiday slot and relinquished its distribution rights of Supergirl to the Salkinds, who gave the distribution rights to Tri-Star Pictures. The film proceeded to be released overseas, however, and received a Royal Film Premiere in the United Kingdom in July 1.

Music

The film score for Supergirl was composed and conducted by veteran composer Jerry Goldsmith, who had been the initial interest of director Richard Donner to compose for the first Superman film. Goldsmith used a number of techniques to identify the music to the film, such as synthesizers simulating the sounds of take-off during the main theme. The soundtrack has been released twice, through Varèse Sarabande in 1985 and an extended version through Silva Screen in 1993. It has also been referred by critics as one of the only redeeming qualities of the movie.

"The Superman Poster", included on the 1993 release, incorporates John Williams's Superman theme.

1985 Varèse Sarabande Album
 "Main Title" (3:12)
 "'Where Is She?'" (1:05)
 "Black Magic" (4:06)
 "First Flight" (4:14)
 "The Butterfly" (1:34)
 "'Where Is Linda?'" (1:14)
 "The Monster Tractor" (7:26)
 "The Bracelet" (1:24)
 "Monster Storm" (2:55)
 "A New School" (2:08)
 "The Flying Car" (1:25)
 "The Map" (1:10)
 "9M-3" (1:41)
 "End Title" (6:05)

1993 Silva Screen Album
 "Overture" (6:07)
 "Main Title & Argo City" (3:15)
 "Argo City Mall" (0:56)
 "The Butterfly" (1:36)
 "The Journey Begins" (1:12)
 "Arrival on Earth/Flying Ballet" (5:36)
 "Chicago Lights/Street Attack" (2:23)
 "The Superman Poster" (0:52)
 "A New School" (2:13)
 "The Map" (1:10)
 "Ethan Spellbound" (2:13)
 "The Monster Tractor" (7:34)
 "Flying Ballet - Alternate Version" (2:13)
 "The Map - Alternate Version" (1:13)
 "The Bracelet" (1:44)
 "First Kiss/The Monster Storm" (4:35)
 "'Where Is She'/The Monster Bumper Cars" (2:57)
 "The Flying Bumper Car" (1:28)
 "'Where's Linda?'" (1:21)
 "Black Magic" (4:08)
 "The Phantom Zone" (3:42)
 "The Vortex/The End of Zaltar" (5:49)
 "The Final Showdown & Victory/End Title - Short Version" (12:10)

Release

Home media
International Video Entertainment paid $3.2 million for North American home video rights, one of the largest deals at the time, and released the Tri-Star-edited 105-min. U.S. version in 1985. The film has since been released several times on home video, laserdisc, and DVD. In 1990, the same 105 minute U.S. cut was re-released on VHS by Avid Home Entertainment. By the mid-1990s, the rights to the film were acquired by Pueblo Film Licensing (successor-in-interest to the Salkind production company) and French production company StudioCanal. By this time Anchor Bay Entertainment had assumed the video rights, where it was re-issued on VHS in 1998 as the "114-minute cut" under the Anchor Bay Entertainment Family Movies label. For their DVD release on August 8, 2000, two versions were issued. The first of these was a 2-disc "Limited Edition" set (limited to 50,000 copies only) featuring the 124-minute "International Version" (never seen in the United States, which was digitally mastered by THX for this DVD release), along with a 138-minute "director's cut", which had been discovered in StudioCanal's archives. The second version was a single-disc version featuring the 124-minute "International Version", with many bonus features: a 16-page full color booklet; Audio Commentary with Director Jeannot Szwarc and Special Project Consultant Scott Michael Bosco; "The Making of Supergirl" Featurette; U.S. & Foreign Theatrical Trailers; U.S. TV Spots; Original Storyboards; Still & Poster Galleries; and Talent Bios (these extra features were also available on the 2-disc "Limited Edition" set). Anchor Bay re-issued a new VHS release once again, this time the 124-minute "International Version" coinciding with the DVD release, both a separate fullscreen and widescreen editions (widescreen version labeled as the "Collector's Edition") under different packaging artwork and digitally mastered by THX. The "Director's Cut" DVD was made from the last print known to exist of the cut, which was apparently prepared for possible television broadcast before the film was edited into its various versions. This longer version was never broadcast on network television in the United States, though it is believed to have been distributed in syndication worldwide.

In 2002, Anchor Bay re-issued the 138 minute "Director's Cut" separately. In November 2006, coinciding with the home video release of Superman Returns, Warner Home Video, now owning the rights to the film through their parent company Warner Bros., released a single-disc DVD featuring the 124-minute "International Version" cut of the film, with only some extra material being carried over from the former out-of-print Anchor Bay releases, a commentary by director Jeannot Szwarc and Special Project Consultant Scott Bosco, and the theatrical trailer. This Warner Bros. release includes an edited version of the audio commentary from the Anchor Bay release. All comments about Anchor Bay are edited out.

It was reissued on 17 July 2018, under the Warner Archive Collection label as a two–disc set, with the International Cut on Blu-ray (in a new 1080p HD remaster), and the "Director's Cut" on DVD, mastered in SD as the only surviving element of the longer version is from the same StudioCanal print used for the previous Anchor Bay release. The commentary from the 2000 video release, "The Making of Supergirl" Featurette, and a theatrical trailer were carried over to WAC's latest issue.

Deleted material

Material that was cut for the 105-minute version of the film included the Argo City opening, which was originally longer.

Another cut scene from the US release is known as the "flying ballet", though included in the International Cut. As Supergirl arrives on Earth, she is surprised to find herself capable of almost anything, especially flying. She can use her super-strength to crack rocks into dust, and use her heat-ray vision to help flowers grow.

Scenes concerning Selena, Bianca, and Nigel were also trimmed. In the U.S. version, Selena's introduction was merely a few lines long when the Omegahedron lands on Earth, and Selena takes it for use of its magic. The full introduction establishes Selena as an impatient witch, who is sick of her mentor and lover, Nigel, who is himself, a warlock. Later scenes not seen before the 2000 DVD release from Anchor Bay Entertainment, include Selena using the Omegahedron for the first time, and realizing that she has no control of herself when under its influence, namely the "Roast Chicken" sequence. Selena later throws a party for all her followers, and deleted material shows Nigel insulting Selena after being dismissed. Nigel then gets friendly with another party member, on whom Selena pulls a vicious magical prank.

Other scenes involve Linda Lee making a temporary home in the city of Midvale, Illinois, and an extended version of the tractor sequence in which the possessed machine runs amok on the Midvale streets and kills a civilian. This alleged death scene does not appear in either the International or the 2000 Director's Cut. Another cut scene shows Supergirl unable to find the Omegahedron because Selena keeps it in a lead box, demonstrating that Supergirl's limitations are similar to those of her cousin. The Phantom Zone scenes are also longer.

The 2006 DVD release and current Blu-Ray reissue by Warner Home Video, whose parent company, Warner Bros., is the current rights holder to the Superman movies, contains the International Edition, also called the "European Theatrical Edition". The latter release also features the aforementioned "director's cut".

Much of the deleted material appeared in DC Comics's one-shot comic book adaptation of the film, primarily the scenes that fleshed out Selena's character.

Broadcast television version
The American theatrical cut for Supergirl ran at 105 minutes. Supergirl originally ran at 124 minutes in its European version. When it aired on network television in 1987, ABC added numerous scenes from the International theatrical version as well as sequences not contained in any other edit. Shown in a two-hour slot, this 92-minute version was essentially a cut-down version of the "Director's Cut", otherwise resembling the U.S. edit, with "offensive" dialogue dubbed over for TV. This same 92-minute version was also seen in syndication on most stations (as well as superstations such as TBS and WGN) by Viacom.

Some broadcast television versions have a scene not seen in either laserdisc edition: After Selena's defeat, Nigel is standing on the street. He bends over to pick up the Coffer of Shadows, now restored to its original, small size and decides to keep it as a memento. In another broadcast-only scene, after Supergirl flies off to return to Argo City, Ethan gets into his truck. He then stops to say goodbye to Lucy and Jimmy. Both scenes can be found in the director's cut.

As aforementioned, the full longer version has never been broadcast on U.S. network television.

Reception

Box office
In the United States, Supergirl was picked up by Tri-Star Pictures for release on 21 November 1984. Test audiences found the film overlong and the film was edited from 135 minutes to 105 minutes for its North American release. Critical reviews in the United States were poor, and although the film took the #1 slot at the North American box-office during its opening weekend, it is widely considered to be a box office bomb after making only $14.3 million in North America.

Critical response
Many of the reviews were harshly negative, with Dunaway's exceedingly campy performance especially reviled. The consensus reads: "The effects are cheesy and Supergirl's wide-eyed, cheery heroine simply isn't interesting to watch for an hour and a half." The film has a Metacritic rating of 42, indicating "mixed or average reviews" from 12 professional reviewers. Variety referred to the film as "intermittently enjoyable spectacle" and described "some well-staged effects highlights, notably a violent storm that threatens the school and the climax which Supergirl and Selena confront each other in the latter's mountain-top castle."

Both Rita Kempley and Paul Attanasio of The Washington Post gave it positive marks. John Grant, writing in The Encyclopedia of Fantasy, was more positive about the film, describing Slater as "an exceptionally charming Supergirl" and wrote that Supergirl had some "excellent—and excellently realised—flights of imagination." Grant criticised the "inconsistent" characterization of Slater and Dunaway's characters. Summing up, he stated while Supergirl "was less than the sum of its parts, not all of those parts are insignificant."

Colin Greenland reviewed Supergirl for Imagine magazine, and stated that "I may be old-fashioned, but I can't help Wishing today's film-makers thought it worthwhile including a little logic In their fantasies, instead of having characters whose motivations, abilities and weaknesses change all the time, with no explanation whatever. A fun film, in a vacuous sort of way."

Accolades
The film was nominated for two Razzie Awards, including Worst Actor for Peter O'Toole and Worst Actress for Faye Dunaway. Helen Slater was nominated for a Saturn Award for Best Actress.

Legacy
Years after her single appearance as Supergirl, Helen Slater took on the recurring role of Lara, biological mother of Clark Kent, on the TV series Smallville (2001-2011), and later played the recurring character of Eliza Danvers, the adopted mother of the titular character in the TV series Supergirl (2015-2021).

Other media

Novelization
A novelization was written by Norma Fox Mazer and released in paperback form in 1984.

References

Further reading

External links

 
 
 
 
 
 SUPERGIRL the Movie at Supergirl: Maid of Might
 Superman Homepage: Supergirl – Movie Synopsis/Review/Critique
 The Superman Super Site - Super Girl
 Original New York Times review

1984 films
Superheroine films
1984 fantasy films
Film
British fantasy adventure films
British science fiction films
Science fantasy films

Superman films

Film spin-offs

TriStar Pictures films

Films directed by Jeannot Szwarc
Films shot at Pinewood Studios
Films scored by Jerry Goldsmith
1980s science fiction films
Films based on DC Comics
Films set on fictional planets
Films about witchcraft
1980s superhero films
Superman (1978 film series)
1980s English-language films
Films with screenplays by David Odell
1980s American films
1980s British films

ja:スーパーガール (スーパーマン)#劇場映画版『スーパーガール』